Aswini Hospital is a private hospital situated in Thrissur, in the Kerala state of India. It is situated near Vadakkechira Bus stand and Poonkunam railway station in Thrissur Corporation. Established as a 40-bed hospital in 1987, it is now a 300-bed Multi-Super Speciality General Hospital. The hospital also runs the Aswini School of Nursing in Nadathara, Thrissur. The hospital offers treatment to the people of Thrissur, Palakkad and Malappuram districts.

Sugathan K K is the managing director of the hospital and O.P Achuthankutty is the chairman. There are 80 Doctors serving in the hospital.

References

External links
Official website
Kerala.gov.in

Hospital buildings completed in 1987
Hospitals established in 1987
Hospitals in Thrissur
1987 establishments in Kerala
20th-century architecture in India